Mike Weber (born August 25, 1997) is an American football running back who is a free agent. He played college football at Ohio State. He has been a member of the Dallas Cowboys, Kansas City Chiefs, Green Bay Packers, and New York Giants of the National Football League (NFL) and the New Jersey Generals of the United States Football League (USFL).

Early years
Weber attended Cass Technical High School in Detroit, Michigan. As a senior, he rushed for 2,268 yards with 26 touchdowns, despite missing three games to injury. 

He averaged 10.1-yards per carry, while helping his team reach the state's semi-finals. He rushed for a state record 404 yards and five touchdowns in the regional championship win over Chippewa Valley High School. He was named All-state, U.S. Army All-American and was a co-recipient of the Detroit player of the year award.

College career
Weber originally accepted a football scholarship from the University of Michigan, but changed his decision to enroll at Ohio State University instead.

After redshirting his first year in 2015, Weber took over as the starting running back role in 2016, replacing Ezekiel Elliott who had graduated. In his first career game he rushed for 136 yards on 19 carries against Bowling Green State University. He led the team with 1,096 rushing yards on 182 carries (6.0-yard average) and 9 rushing touchdowns in 13 starts. At the end of the season, he was named the Thompson–Randle El Freshman of the Year and second-team All-Big Ten.

As a sophomore, he suffered a left hamstring injury during summer workouts that kept him out most of training camp, falling behind on the depth chart behind true freshman J. K. Dobbins. He got healthy in the latter part of the season, finishing with 101 carries for 626 yards (6.2-yard average) and 10 rushing touchdowns in a backup role.

As a junior, he was again the backup behind Dobbins, while appearing in 13 games (2 starts). He registered 172 carries for 954 yards (5.5-yard average) and 6 touchdowns. He switched his jersey number from 25 to 5 (the number he wore when he played little league football in Detroit) for the contest against the University of Michigan, returning to his former number for the team's final two games.

On December 16, 2018, Weber announced that he would forgo his final year of eligibility and declared for the 2019 NFL Draft.

Statistics

Professional career

Dallas Cowboys
Weber was selected by the Dallas Cowboys in the seventh round (218th overall) of the 2019 NFL Draft. He was waived on August 31, 2019 and was re-signed to the practice squad. His practice squad contract with the team expired on January 6, 2020.

Kansas City Chiefs
On January 8, 2020, Weber was signed to the Kansas City Chiefs practice squad. Weber won Super Bowl LIV with the Chiefs after they defeated the San Francisco 49ers 31–20. He re-signed with the Chiefs on February 5, 2020. On May 4, 2020, Weber was waived by the Chiefs, after the team drafted Clyde Edwards-Helaire in the first round and signed free agent DeAndre Washington.

Green Bay Packers
On November 11, 2020, Weber was signed to the Green Bay Packers' practice squad. He was elevated to the active roster on November 21 and 28 for the team's weeks 11 and 12 games against the Indianapolis Colts and Chicago Bears, and reverted to the practice squad after each game. On January 25, 2021, Weber signed a reserve/futures contract with the Packers. On June 9, 2021, Weber was waived by the Packers.

New York Giants
On July 21, 2021, Weber signed with the New York Giants. He was placed on injured reserve on August 4, 2021 with a hip flexor. He was released on August 13.

New Jersey Generals
Weber was drafted by the New Jersey Generals in the 27th round of the 2022 USFL Draft in February 2022. He suffered a knee injury before the start of the season, and was transferred to the team's practice squad on April 14, 2022. He was released on April 19, 2022.

References

External links
Ohio State Buckeyes bio

1997 births
Living people
Players of American football from Detroit
American football running backs
Ohio State Buckeyes football players
Dallas Cowboys players
Kansas City Chiefs players
Green Bay Packers players
New York Giants players
New Jersey Generals (2022) players